Brookton is an unincorporated community in Hall County, in the U.S. state of Georgia.

History
A post office was established at Brookton in 1914, and remained in operation until 1944. The community was named after John Prescott Brooke, a pioneer citizen.

References

Unincorporated communities in Hall County, Georgia
Unincorporated communities in Georgia (U.S. state)